The Anarchist Encyclopedia was an encyclopedia initiated by the French anarchist activist Sébastien Faure, between 1925 and 1934, published in four volumes.

The original project was to be in five parts:

an anarchist dictionary
a history of anarchist thought and action
 biographies of militants and thinkers
 biographies of individuals having contributed by their works to human emancipation
 a catalogue of anarchist books and reviews

Only the first part in four volumes of 2,893 pages was made. It included many anarchist tendencies. There were several hundred collaborators including, in addition to Sebastien Faure himself, Luigi Bertoni, Pierre Besnard, Émile Armand, Han Ryner, Augustin Souchy, Max Nettlau, Volin, Aristide Lapeyre, Gérard de Lacaze-Duthiers, and others.

External links
 The anarchist encyclopedia Volume 1 Volume 2 Volume 3 Volume 4

Books about anarchism
Anarchist works